Aminath Shajan (born 1993) is a Maldivian swimmer. She was born in Malé. She competed at the 2012 Summer Olympics in London. Shajan also competed in the 2016 Summer Olympics in Rio de Janeiro in the Women's 100 metre freestyle event where she ranked 46th with a time of 1:05.71. She did not advance to the semifinals. She was the flagbearer for the Maldives during the Parade of Nations.

References

External links

1993 births
Living people
People from Malé
Maldivian female swimmers
Maldivian female freestyle swimmers
Olympic swimmers of the Maldives
Swimmers at the 2012 Summer Olympics
Swimmers at the 2016 Summer Olympics
Swimmers at the 2010 Summer Youth Olympics
Swimmers at the 2014 Asian Games
Asian Games competitors for the Maldives
South Asian Games bronze medalists for Maldives
South Asian Games medalists in swimming